Dry Run is an unincorporated community in Pendleton County, West Virginia, United States. Dry Run lies along Snowy Mountain Road (County Route 17).

The community takes its name from nearby Dry Run creek.

References

Unincorporated communities in Pendleton County, West Virginia
Unincorporated communities in West Virginia